Erwin Panofsky (March 30, 1892 in Hannover – March 14, 1968 in Princeton, New Jersey) was a German-Jewish art historian, whose academic career was pursued mostly in the U.S. after the rise of the Nazi regime.

Panofsky's work represents a high point in the modern academic study of iconography, which he used in hugely influential works like his "little book" Renaissance and Renascences in Western Art and his masterpiece, Early Netherlandish Painting.

Many of his works are still in print, including Studies in Iconology: Humanist Themes in the Art of the Renaissance (1939), Meaning in the Visual Arts (1955), and his  1943 study The Life and Art of Albrecht Dürer. Panofsky's ideas were also highly influential in intellectual history in general, particularly in his use of historical ideas to interpret artworks and vice versa.

Biography

Panofsky was born in Hannover to a wealthy Jewish Silesian mining family. He grew up in Berlin, receiving his Abitur in 1910 at the Joachimsthalsches Gymnasium.  In 1910–14 he studied law, philosophy, philology, and art history in Freiburg, Munich, and Berlin, where he heard lectures by the art historian Margarete Bieber, who was filling in for Georg Loeschcke.

While Panofsky was taking courses at Freiburg University, a slightly older student, Kurt Badt, took him to hear a lecture by the founder of the art history department, Wilhelm Vöge, under whom he wrote his dissertation in 1914. His topic, Dürer's artistic theory Dürers Kunsttheorie: vornehmlich in ihrem Verhaltnis zur Kunsttheorie der Italiener was published the following year in Berlin as Die Theoretische Kunstlehre Albrecht Dürers.  Because of a horse-riding accident, Panofsky was exempted from military service during World War I, using the time to attend the seminars of the medievalist Adolph Goldschmidt in Berlin.

Panofsky's academic career in art history took him to the University of Berlin, University of Munich, and finally to University of Hamburg, where he taught from 1920 to 1933. It was during this period that his first major writings on art history began to appear. A significant early work was Idea: Ein Beitrag zur Begriffsgeschichte der älteren Kunstheorie (1924; translated into English as Idea: A Concept in Art Theory), based on the ideas of Ernst Cassirer.

Panofsky first came to the United States in 1931 to teach at New York University. Although initially allowed to spend alternate terms in Hamburg and New York City, after the Nazis came to power in Germany his appointment in Hamburg was terminated because he was Jewish, and he remained permanently in the United States with his art historian wife (since 1916), Dorothea "Dora" Mosse (1885–1965). He and his wife became part of the Kahler-Kreis.

By 1934 Panofsky was teaching concurrently at New York University and Princeton University, and in 1935 he was invited to join the faculty of the new Institute for Advanced Study in Princeton, New Jersey, where he remained for the rest of his career.  In 1999, "Panofsky Lane", named in his honor, was created in the institute's faculty housing complex.

Panofsky was a member of the American Academy of Arts and Sciences, the British Academy and a number of other national academies. In 1954 he became foreign member of the Royal Netherlands Academy of Arts and Sciences. In 1962 he received the Haskins Medal of The Medieval Academy of America.  In 1947–1948 Panofsky was the Charles Eliot Norton professor at Harvard University; the lectures later became Early Netherlandish Painting.

Panofsky became particularly well known for his studies of symbols and iconography in art.  First in a 1934 article, then in his Early Netherlandish Painting (1953), Panofsky was the first to interpret Jan van Eyck's Arnolfini Portrait (1934) as not only a depiction of a wedding ceremony, but also a visual contract testifying to the act of marriage.  Panofsky identifies a plethora of hidden symbols that all point to the sacrament of marriage. In recent years, this conclusion has been challenged, but Panofsky's work with what he called "hidden" or "disguised" symbolism is still very much influential in the study and understanding of Northern Renaissance art.

Similarly, in his monograph on Dürer, Panofsky gives lengthy "symbolic" analyses of the prints Knight, Death, and the Devil and Melancolia I, the former based on Erasmus's Handbook of a Christian Knight.

Panofsky was known to be a friend with physicists Wolfgang Pauli and Albert Einstein. His younger son, Wolfgang K. H. Panofsky, became a renowned physicist who specialized in particle accelerators.  His elder son, Hans A. Panofsky, was "an atmospheric scientist who taught at Pennsylvania State University for 30 years and who was credited with several advances in the study of meteorology".  As Wolfgang Panofsky related, his father used to call his sons "meine beiden Klempner" ("my two plumbers"). William S. Heckscher was a student, fellow emigre, and close friend.  In 1973 he was succeeded at Princeton by Irving Lavin.
Erwin Panofsky has been recognized as both a "highly distinguished" professor at the Institute for Advanced Study, Princeton, New Jersey, and in Jeffrey Chipps' biography of the subject as "the most influential art historian of the twentieth century”.  In 1999, the new "Panofsky Lane", in that Institute's faculty housing complex, was named in his honor.

Iconology 

Panofsky was the most eminent representative of iconology, a method of studying the history of art created by Aby Warburg and his disciples, especially Fritz Saxl, at the Warburg Institute in Hamburg. A personal and professional friendship linked him to Fritz Saxl in collaboration with whom he produced a large part of his work. He gave a short and precise description of his method in his article "Iconography and Iconology", published in 1939.

Style and the Film Medium 
In his 1936 essay "Style and Medium in the Motion Pictures (text online), Panofsky seeks to describe the visual symptoms endemic" to the medium of film.

Three strata of subject matter or meaning

In Studies in Iconology Panofsky details his idea of three levels of art-historical understanding:

Primary or natural subject matter: The most basic level of understanding, this stratum consists of perception of the work's pure form.  Take, for example, a painting of the Last Supper.  If we stopped at this first stratum, such a picture could only be perceived as a painting of 13 men seated at a table.  This first level is the most basic understanding of a work, devoid of any added cultural knowledge.
Secondary or conventional subject matter (iconography): This stratum goes a step further and brings to the equation cultural and iconographic knowledge.  For example, a Western viewer would understand that the painting of 13 men around a table would represent the Last Supper.  Similarly, a representation of a haloed man with a lion could be interpreted as a depiction of St. Mark.
Tertiary or intrinsic meaning or content (iconology): This level takes into account personal, technical, and cultural history into the understanding of a work.  It looks at art not as an isolated incident, but as the product of a historical environment.  Working in this stratum, the art historian can ask questions like “why did the artist choose to represent The Last Supper in this way?”  or “Why was St. Mark such an important saint to the patron of this work?”  Essentially, this last stratum is a synthesis; it is the art historian asking "what does it all mean?"

For Panofsky, it was important to consider all three strata as one examines Renaissance art. Irving Lavin says  "it was this insistence on, and search for, meaning — especially in places where no one suspected there was any — that led Panofsky to understand art, as no previous historian had, as an intellectual endeavor on a par with the traditional liberal arts."

Manuscript of Panofsky's Habilitationsschrift 
In August 2012, the original manuscript of Panofsky's Habilitationsschrift of 1920, which is entitled "Die Gestaltungsprinzipien Michelangelos, besonders in ihrem Verhältnis zu denen Raffaels" ("The Composition Principles of Michelangelo, particularly in their relation to those of Raphael"), was found by art historian Stephan Klingen in an old Nazi safe in Munich's Zentralinstitut für Kunstgeschichte.

It had long been assumed that this manuscript was lost in 1943/44 in Hamburg, as this important study was never published and the art historian's widow was unable to locate it in Hamburg. It seems as if art historian  Ludwig Heinrich Heydenreich, who had studied under Panofsky, was in the possession of this manuscript from 1946 to 1970. In the Süddeutsche Zeitung, Willibald Sauerländer shed some light on the question of whether Heydenreich shared his recovery of the manuscript or not: "Panofsky has historically distanced himself from his early writings on Michelangelo, as he tired of the subject, and (according to Sauerländer) developed a professional conflict with Austro-Hungarian art historian Johannes Wilde, who accused Panofsky of not crediting him with ideas gleaned from a conversation they had about Michelangelo drawings. Perhaps Panofsky didn't care about the whereabouts of his lost work and Heydenreich was not malicious in keeping it a secret ... but questions still remain."

In 2016 The Zentralinstitut für Kunstgeschichte in Munich founded the Panofsky-Professur (Panofsky Professorship). The first Panofsky Professors have been Victor Stoichita (2016), Gauvin Alexander Bailey (2017), Caroline van Eck (2018), and Olivier Bonfait (2019).

Influence on Bourdieu
His work has greatly influenced the theory of taste developed by French sociologist Pierre Bourdieu, in books such as The Rules of Art and Distinction.  In particular, Bourdieu first adapted his notion of habitus from Panofsky's Gothic Architecture and Scholasticism, having earlier translated the work into French.

Works
 Idea: A Concept in Art Theory (1924)
 Perspective as Symbolic Form (1927)
 Studies in Iconology (1939)
 The Life and Art of Albrecht Dürer (1943)
 (trans.) Abbot Suger on the Abbey Church of St.-Denis and its art treasures (1946). Based on the Norman Wait Harris lectures delivered at Northwestern university in 1938.
 Gothic Architecture and Scholasticism (1951)
 Early Netherlandish Painting: Its Origins and Character (1953). Based on the 1947–48 Charles Eliot Norton Lectures.
 Meaning in the Visual Arts (1955)
 Pandora's Box: the Changing Aspects of a Mythical Symbol (1956) (with Dora Panofsky)
 Renaissance and Renascences in Western Art (1960)
 Tomb Sculpture: Four Lectures on Its Changing Aspects from Ancient Egypt to Bernini (1964)
 Saturn and Melancholy: Studies in the History of Natural Philosophy, Religion, and Art (1964) (with Raymond Klibansky and Fritz Saxl)
 Problems in Titian, mostly iconographic (1969)
 Three Essays on Style (1995; ed. Irving Lavin): "What Is Baroque?", "Style and Medium in the Motion Pictures", "The Ideological Antecedents of the Rolls-Royce Radiator". Intro. by Irving Lavin.
 
 Carmina Latina (2018; ed. with introduction and short annotations by Gereon Becht-Jördens)

References
References

Sources
Holly, Michael Ann, Panofsky and the Foundations of Art History, Ithaca, Cornell University Press, (1985)
Ferretti, Sylvia, Cassirer, Panofsky, Warburg: Symbol, Art, and History, New Haven, Yale University Press, (1989)
Lavin, Irving, editor, Meaning in the Visual Arts: View from the Outside. A Centennial Commemoration of Erwin Panofsky (1892–1968), Princeton, Institute for Advanced Study, (1995)
Panofsky, Erwin, & Lavin, Irving (Ed.), Three essays on style, Cambridge, MA, MIT Press, (1995)
 Panofsky, Erwin.  in the  Dictionary of Art Historians, Lee Sorensen, ed.
Wuttke, Dieter (Ed.), Erwin Panofsky. Korrespondenz, Wiesbaden, Harrassowitz, (2001–2011)

External links

 
 
Erwin Panofsky Papers at the Smithsonian's Archives of American Art
Rainer Donandt, "Erwin Panofsky – Ikonologe und Anwalt der Vernunft"
 Emmanuel Alloa, Could Perspective Ever Be A Symbolic Form. Revisiting Panofsky with Cassirer, in Journal of Aesthetics and Phenomenology 2.1 (2015)

Panofsky Bibliography: The Major Works – Compiled by Joseph Connors
Daniel Sherer, “Panofsky on Architecture: Iconology and the Interpretation of Built Form,1915-1956,” History of Humanities 5, 1 (Spring 2020), 189–221; Panofsky on Architecture, Part II: Mental Habits, Disguised Symbolism, and the “Spell of Circularity," History of Humanities 5,2 (Fall, 2020), 345–66.

1892 births
1968 deaths
Institute for Advanced Study faculty
Writers from Hanover
People from the Province of Hanover
German art historians
Jewish historians
American people of German-Jewish descent
University of Freiburg alumni
Ludwig Maximilian University of Munich alumni
Humboldt University of Berlin alumni
Academic staff of the University of Hamburg
New York University faculty
Princeton University faculty
Harvard University faculty
Joachimsthalsches Gymnasium alumni
Jewish emigrants from Nazi Germany to the United States
People associated with the Warburg Institute
German male non-fiction writers
Members of the Royal Netherlands Academy of Arts and Sciences
Members of the Royal Academy of Belgium
Scholars of Netherlandish art
Corresponding Fellows of the Medieval Academy of America
Recipients of the Pour le Mérite (civil class)
Corresponding Fellows of the British Academy